Julia Lee may refer to:

Julia Lee (musician) (1902–1958), American blues musician
Julia Lee (actress), American actress
Julia Lee (rugby league), British rugby league referee
Julia Southard Lee, American textile chemist